Nataliya Andreyevna Ustinova (born 22 December 1944) is an Uzbekistani former swimmer. She competed at the 1964 and 1968 Summer Olympics in the individual 100 m freestyle and 4 × 100 m relays and won a bronze medal in 1964 in the 4 × 100 m medley relay. She was part of the Soviet team that won the 4 × 100 m freestyle relay at the 1966 European Aquatics Championships, setting a new European record. Between 1962 and 1968 she collected 16 national titles in the 100 m and 200 m freestyle and in relays.

References

1944 births
Living people
Uzbekistani female freestyle swimmers
Soviet female freestyle swimmers
Olympic swimmers of the Soviet Union
Swimmers at the 1964 Summer Olympics
Swimmers at the 1968 Summer Olympics
Olympic bronze medalists for the Soviet Union
Olympic bronze medalists in swimming
European Aquatics Championships medalists in swimming
Sportspeople from Tashkent
Uzbekistani people of Russian descent
Medalists at the 1964 Summer Olympics
20th-century Uzbekistani women
21st-century Uzbekistani women